Muirfield High School is a public, co-educational, secondary day school located in North Rocks, a north-western suburb of Sydney, New South Wales, Australia.

Established in 1976 and operated by the New South Wales Department of Education, Muirfield is a non-selective school catering for approximately 738 students from Years 7 to 12.

A defining feature of the school is its agricultural program run out of the Barclay farm. Muirfield has run an agricultural display at the Castle Hill Show since 1992. In 2006 the school won the award for "Best School Display". Issues arising from drought resulted in the School withdrawing from the show in 2007. In 2010 Muirfield High School was invited to participate in the first Sydney Royal Easter Show Schools Fruit and Vegetable Display, where the school was awarded 2nd place. Muirfield High School was invited back to compete, representing the Western District, in 2011 and 2012 with the school being awarded 1st place both years for their innovative designs that both engaged and reflected the current agricultural climate.

The school often participates in Rock Eisteddfod. In 2003, Muirfield won the Small Schools division of the Rock Eisteddfod Challenge.

History
Muirfield High School opened in 1976 as a comprehensive, co-educational high school.

In 1989, the school was identified as one of twenty-six Technology High Schools in New South Wales, becoming one of the first Public schools in New South Wales to introduce computers into the curriculum. The aim of the 'Technology High School' was to produce "technologically-literate people" and to give an advantage to students who are seeking a career in computing or technology-based industries. Additionally over the past five years (2014-2018) the school has had a student in the top ten of State for the HSC/TAFE course Information & Digital Technology. 

The school then re-branded itself to Muirfield High School and now caters for 800+ students throughout year 7-12 in large range of subjects including; English, Mathematics, Visual Arts, Hospitality/Food Tech, Industrial Design, Construction, Sciences, HSIE, Business / Legal Studies, Japanese, and Agriculture as well as various Information Technology Courses.

Campus

Muirfield High school is located on a single campus, situated in suburban North Rocks. It is bordered by two main roads, the M2 motorway and Barclay Road, a major thoroughfare for the North West part of Sydney.

The school's sporting facilities include a baseball diamond which is used extensively by the Carlingford Baseball Club, in the summer and winter baseball seasons. It also includes several sheltered basketball courts and two fields for sporting activities.

Learning facilities include a three-level library open to students of all years, and three computer rooms.

The grounds are also situated next to Barclay Farm which it uses for growing and caring for plants, produce, and livestock.

Alumni
Tom Burton (sailor)
Chad Staples - Zookeeper at Featherdale Wildlife Park
 Aideen Keane (athlete - football for Perth Glory FC in the W-League.

See also
 List of Government schools in New South Wales

References

External links
Muirfield High School

Rock Eisteddfod Challenge participants
Public high schools in Sydney
Educational institutions established in 1976
1976 establishments in Australia